Kitchin may refer to:

 Kitchin (surname)
 The Kitchin, a restaurant in Edinburgh, Scotland, UK
 Kitchin cycle, business cycle of about 40 months long
 , U.S. cargo ship launched in 1945

See also
 Kitchen (disambiguation)